RiverCity Leadership Academy (also known as RLA) is a fully accredited high school in which students share common wilderness experiences, use applied technology, study under a group of teachers and create their own projects according to individual interests. RiverCity Leadership Academy is the first Project-based high school in Washington state to utilize this successful and revolutionary hands-on approach to learning developed by the EdVisions coop. The student projects will provide individualized HSPE preparation and T & I certifications. The school is a West Valley School District program serving Spokane youth, grades 9–12.  Students attend school full-time in pursuit of an education that will leave them Citizenship, college, and Career ready.

External links
 School homepage

Schools in Washington (state)